Stefano Di Marino (28 March 1961 – 6 August 2021) was an Italian author of pulp fiction, specializing in the horror and thriller genres. He wrote hundreds of books, using pseudonyms such as Stephen Gunn and Xavier LeNormand. He died by suicide in his home town of Milan at the age of 60.

References

1961 births
2021 deaths
2021 suicides
20th-century Italian writers
21st-century Italian writers
Suicides by jumping in Italy
Suicides in Milan